Farallón de Pájaros (from Spanish Farallón de Pájaros, meaning "Birds' Sea Stack", see Stack (geology)), also known as Uracus or Urracas (from Spanish Urracas, meaning "Magpies"), is a small (2.3 km2) uninhabited volcanic island, the northernmost island in the Northern Mariana Islands chain.

History

Farallón de Pájaros was ceded by Spain to Germany through the German–Spanish Treaty (1899), toghether with the rest of the Mariana Islands (except Guam). The formalities of cession were carried on November 17, 1899, in Saipan, for all the Northern Mariana Islands.

From 1899 to 1914, Farallón de Pájaros was controlled by the German Empire and was administered as part of the colony of German New Guinea. In 1903 the island was leased to a Japanese company, which hunted birds whose feathers were exported to Japan and then to Paris.

After World War I, the island was awarded to the Empire of Japan, by the League of Nations as part of the South Seas Mandate. After World War II, Farallón de Pájaros was awarded to the United States as part of the UN Trust Territory of the Pacific Islands, and is currently administered as part of the Northern Islands Municipality of the Commonwealth of the Northern Mariana Islands.

In 1985, per the Constitution of the Commonwealth of the Northern Mariana Islands, the island was designated as a wilderness area for the protection and conservation of natural resources. Since 2009, the island has been part of Marianas Trench Marine National Monument of the United States.

Geography

Farallón de Pájaros is the northernmost island of the Marianas chain.

Volcanic activity
Between 1864 and 1953, 15 volcanic eruptions of Farallón de Pájaros have been recorded.

It is associated with a possible eruption in 1979, an eruption in 2001, and a series of underwater eruptions from 24 April to 17 May 2014, with hydrothermal activity continuing at least to December 2014.

Important Bird Area
The island has been recognised as an Important Bird Area (IBA) by BirdLife International because it supports populations of Micronesian megapodes and sooty terns.

See also
Okinotorishima

References
 Horst Lehne and Christoph Gäbler: Über die Marianen. Lehne-Verlag, Wohldorf in Germany 1972.
 Russell E. Brainard et al.: Coral reef ecosystem monitoring report of the Mariana Archipelago: 2003–2007. (=PIFSC Special Publication, SP-12-01) NOAA Fisheries, Pacific Islands Fisheries Science Center 2012 (Kapitel Farallon de Pajaros (englisch, PDF, 10,4 MB)).

Notes

External links

Stratovolcanoes of the United States
Active volcanoes
Volcanoes of the Northern Mariana Islands
Former German colonies
Uninhabited islands of the Northern Mariana Islands
Important Bird Areas of the Northern Mariana Islands
Seabird colonies
Holocene stratovolcanoes